Eumannia is a genus of moths in the family Geometridae. It was described by David Stephen Fletcher in 1979.

Species
 Eumannia lepraria (Rebel, 1909)
 Eumannia oppositaria (Mann, 1864)
 Eumannia psyloritaria (Reisser, 1958)

References

Boarmiini